Benjamin Smith (August 23, 1786 – March 25, 1873) was a farmer, land surveyor and political figure in Nova Scotia. He represented Hants County in the Nova Scotia House of Assembly from 1836 to 1847 and from 1851 to 1855 as a Conservative.

He was born in Kennetcook, Nova Scotia, the son of Colonel William Smith and Susannah Lake. Smith was married twice: first to Mary Oxley in 1812 and then to Eliza Cole in 1826. He served fifty years as a justice of the peace and was deputy government surveyor. Smith died in Newport at the age of 86.

His brother Richard also served in the assembly.

References 
 

1786 births
1873 deaths
Nova Scotia pre-Confederation MLAs